The 2019–20 Lebanese Women's Football League was the 13th edition of the Lebanese Women's Football League since it was formed in 2008.

Defending champions SAS won their fifth title, after beating EFP 4–2 in the final matchday of the season. Safa, who made their debut, came second.

League table

Group A

Group B

Final eight

Top goalscorers

References

External links
 RSSSF.com

Lebanese Women's Football League seasons
W1
Lebanese Women's Football League